The 1926 Missouri Tigers football team was an American football team that represented the University of Missouri as a member of the Missouri Valley Conference (MVC) during the 1926 college football season. The team compiled an overall record of 5–1–2 with a mark of 4–1 against conference opponents, tie for third place in the MVC, and outscored all opponents by a combined total of 122 to 33. Gwinn Henry was the head coach for the fourth of nine seasons.

On October 2, 1926, the team played its first game at the new Memorial Stadium in Columbia, Missouri. The game, a scoreless tie with Tulane, was played in the rain before a crowd of 10,000 persons. The first Missouri touchdown at the new stadium was scored on October 16 on a pass from Emmett "Abe" Stuber to Bert Clark. The first Missouri victory in the new stadium was a 45-6 victory over Washington University on November 13.

Schedule

References

Missouri
Missouri Tigers football seasons
Missouri Tigers football